Marie Červinková-Riegrová (9 August 1854 in Prague – 19 January 1895 in Prague) was a Czech writer.

She wrote the libretto Dimitrij for Karel Šebor, but then offered it to Antonín Dvořák who set it to music in 1881.

References

1854 births
1895 deaths
Czech women writers
Women opera librettists
Writers from Prague
19th-century women writers
19th-century Czech writers
Czech opera librettists
19th-century Czech dramatists and playwrights